Geovanna del Carmen Bañuelos de la Torre (born 23 February 1980) is a Mexican politician. She is a member of the Labor Party. She has been twice elected as a deputy to the Congress of Zacatecas and is currently a national list Senator and coordinator of the Labor Party caucus in the Senate of the Republic. A native of Guadalupe, Zacatecas, she received her degree in architecture from the Zacatecas Institute of Technology.

See also 
 LXV Legislature of the Mexican Congress

References 

1980 births
Living people
Labor Party (Mexico) politicians
21st-century Mexican women politicians
Senators of the LXIV and LXV Legislatures of Mexico
Politicians from Zacatecas
Members of the Congress of Zacatecas
People from Guadalupe, Zacatecas
Women members of the Senate of the Republic (Mexico)